List of Diptera of Ireland Superfamilies Xylophagoidea, Tabanoidea, Stratiomyoidea, Nemestrinoidea, Asiloidea
Part of List of Diptera of Ireland

Superfamily Xylophagoidea

Xylophagidae
	
Xylophagus ater Meigen 1804

Superfamily Tabanoidea

Athericidae 
	
Atherix ibis (Fabricus 1798)
Atherix marginata  (Fabricius 1781)

Rhagionidae
	
Chrysopilus asiliformis (Preyssler 1791)
Chrysopilus cristatus (Fabricius 1775)
Rhagio lineola Fabricius 1794
Rhagio scolopaceus (Linnaeus 1758)
Rhagio tringarius (Linnaeus 1758)

Spaniidae
 
Symphoromyia crassicornis (Panzer 1806) 
Ptiolina obscura  (Fallén, 1814) 
Spania  nigra  Meigen, 1830

Tabanidae
	
Atylotus fulvus (Meigen 1804)
Chrysops caecutiens (Linnaeus 1758)
Chrysops relictus Meigen 1820
Chrysops sepulcralis (Fabricius 1794)
Chrysops viduatus (Fabricius 1794)
Haematopota crassicornis Wahlberg 1848
Haematopota pluvialis (Linnaeus 1758)
Hybomitra montana (Meigen 1820)
Hybomitra muehlfeldi (Brauer 1880)
Tabanus bromius Linnaeus 1758
Tabanus sudeticus Zeller 1842

Superfamily Stratiomyoidea

Stratiomyidae
	
Beris chalybata (Forster 1771)
Beris clavipes (Linnaeus 1767)
Beris fuscipes Meigen 1820
Beris geniculata Curtis 1830
Beris morrisii Dale 1841
Beris vallata (Forster 1771)
Chloromyia formosa (Scopoli 1763)
Chorisops nagatomii Rozkosny 1979
Chorisops tibialis (Meigen 1820)
Microchrysa cyaneiventris (Zetterstedt 1842)
Microchrysa flavicornis (Meigen 1822)
Microchrysa polita (Linnaeus 1758)
Nemotelus nigrinus Fallen 1817
Nemotelus notatus Zetterstedt 1842
Nemotelus  pantherinus (Linnaeus 1758)
Nemotelus uliginosus (Linnaeus 1767)
Oplodontha viridula (Fabricius 1775)
Oxycera fallenii Staeger 1844
Oxycera morrisii Curtis 1833
Oxycera nigricornis Olivier 1812
Oxycera pardalina Meigen 1822
Oxycera pygmaea (Fallen 1817)
Oxycera trilineata (Linnaeus 1767)
Pachygaster atra (Panzer 1798)
Pachygaster leachii Curtis 1824
Sargus bipunctatus (Scopoli 1763)
Sargus flavipes Meigen 1822
Sargus iridatus (Scopoli 1763)
Stratiomys singularior (Harris 1776)
Vanoyia tenuicornis (Macquart 1834)
Zabrachia tenella (Jaennicke 1866)

Superfamily Nemestrinoidea

Acroceridae 
Acrocera orbiculus (Fabricius, 1787 )

Superfamily Asiloidea

Bombyliidae 

Bombylius canescens Mikan 1796
Bombylius major Linnaeus 1758
Phthiria pulicaria (Mikan 1796)
Villa modesta (Meigen 1820)

Therevidae 
Acrosathe annulata (Fabricius, 1805)   
Dialineura anilis (Linnaeus, 1761) 
Thereva nobilitata (Fabricius, 1775)

Scenopinidae 
Scenopinus fenestralis (Linnaeus, 1758 ) 
Scenopinus niger (De Geer, 1776)

Asilidae 
Machimus cowini (Hobby, 1946) 
Neoitamus cyanurus (Loew, 1849) 
Philonicus albiceps (Meigen, 1820)

References
Chandler, P.J. 1975. An account of the Irish species of two-winged flies (Diptera) belonging to the families of Larger Brachycera (Tabanoidea and Asiloidea). Proceedings of the Royal Irish Academy Vol.75, Section B, No. 2. Royal Irish Academy. Dublin
Van Veen Key Illustrated Identification keys 
Harold Oldroyd, 1969 Diptera, Brachycera : section (a) : Tabanoidea and Asiloidea Handbooks for the identification of British insects, v. 9, pt. 4 Royal Entomological Society of London. pdf

Verrall, G. H., 1909 Stratiomyidae and succeeding families of the Diptera Brachycera of Great Britain- British flies (1909)BHL Full text with illustrations 

Ireland, diptera, xylo
diptera 
Xylo